The Wiesbaden Phantoms are an American football team from Wiesbaden, Germany.

The team experienced its greatest success in 2010, earning promotion to the German Football League.

History
The club was formed in 1984, originally as a department of a local association football club and, from 1986, independent as the AFC Wiesbaden Phantoms e.V..

The Wiesbaden Phantoms first entered league football in 1985, when they joined the tier-three Regionalliga Mitte. In this league, the club was instantaneously successful, winning it in 1985 and 1986. The Phantoms earned promotion to the central division of the 2nd Bundesliga on the strength of these titles, a league the club would play in for the next six seasons. The team's best result in this era was a second place in 1991, but a sixth-place finish the following season saw the club relegated back to the Regionalliga.

The following four seasons saw the club in decline, so much so that it dropped all the way to the fifth tier Landesliga for 1998, having been unable to field a team in 1997, but it was able to recover and begun its climb back up with a title in this division. By 2000, the club was back in the third division, where it became a top side without quite achieving another promotion until 2003, when the Phantoms once more won their league and returned to the 2nd Bundesliga.

Like in the Regionalliga, the club was a strong side in the southern division of this league, finishing runners-up on five occasions in the next seven seasons. Another runners-up finish in 2010, in a league now renamed German Football League 2, saw the team qualify for the promotion round because of an enlargement of the GFL from 12 to 14 teams. The Phantoms beat the Weinheim Longhorns convincingly in both promotion games and thereby achieved entry to Germany's elite league for the first time.

The club came fifth in its first season in the GFL in 2011, well clear of the play-off ranks with only three wins and a draw to its name. In 2012, the club came sixth in the southern division of the GFL and thereby failed to qualify for the play-offs.

The 2013 season saw the club come last in the southern division and having to enter the relegation round where it lost to Allgäu Comets and was relegated from the GFL to the GFL2, where it came second in 2014 and fifth in 2015.

2016 the Phantoms reached a 10–4 record under Head Coach Patrick Griesheimer and became third best team of the GFL2 but decreased to 4–7–1 in 2017. After finishing the season only on sixth place in 2016 the Phantoms changed their coaching staff. In 2017 Andy McMillan became Head Coach of the Phantoms to play two seasons with the team - McMillan had a 7–7 record in his first and a 5–7 record in his second season – worth a fifth and a sixth place in the GFL2.

In 2020 the Phantoms did not play a season because of the COVID-19 pandemic. Tibor Gohmert – former coach of the GFL team Marburg Mercenaries – became new Head Coach in 2020, planning to play his first season in 2021.

Honours
 GFL
 League membership: (3) 2011–2013

Recent seasons
Recent seasons of the club:

 RR = Relegation round
 PR = Promotion round
 In the 2011 season, the game against Plattling Black Hawks was not played.

References

External links
  Official website
  German Football League official website
  Football History Historic American football tables from Germany

American football teams in Germany
German Football League teams
American football teams established in 1984
Sport in Wiesbaden
1984 establishments in West Germany
American football in Hesse